Pite Sámi or Arjeplog Sámi is a Sámi language traditionally spoken in Sweden and Norway. It is a critically endangered language that has only about 25–50 native speakers left and is now only spoken on the Swedish side of the border along the Pite River in the north of Arjeplog and Arvidsjaur and in the mountainous areas of the Arjeplog municipality.

Classification
Pite Sámi is a part of the Western Sámi group, together with Southern Sámi and Ume Sámi to the south, Lule Sámi and Northern Sámi to the north. Of these, Pite Sámi shows closest affinity to Lule Sámi, but a number of features also show similarity to Ume and Southern Sámi.

Phonology

Consonants

The Pite Sámi consonant inventory is very similar to that found in neighbouring Lule Sámi, but lacks contrastive voicing of stops and affricates entirely.

 Stops before a homorganic nasal (pre-stopped nasals) are realised as unreleased stops.
  is realised as a labiodental fricative  in the syllable onset (before a vowel), and as bilabial  in the syllable coda (in a consonant cluster).
  is present only in the language of some elderly speakers.

Vowels

The Pite Sámi vowel inventory has a relative lack of phonemic diphthongs, compared to other Sámi languages and particularly neighbouring Lule Sámi. Instead, there are more vowel height distinctions.

 The close vowels /i/ and /u/ are realized as laxer [ɪ] and [ʊ] respectively, in unstressed positions.
 Close-mid /e/ and /o/ are diphthongized to [ie̯] and [uo̯] respectively, when stressed.
  does not occur in unstressed syllables.
  can occur in unstressed syllables, but only when a preceding stressed syllable contains .

Sammallahti divides Lule Sámi dialects as follows:

 Northern dialects: Luokta-Mávas in Sweden
 Central dialects: Semisjaur-Njarg in Sweden
 Southern dialects: Svaipa in Sweden

Features of the northern dialects are:
 Lack of  →  umlaut.
 Voicing in quantity 3 of plain stops (thus strong  ~ weak  etc.), like in Lule Sámi.
  as the outcome of Proto-Samic *đ.

Features of the southern dialects are:
  as the outcome of Proto-Samic *đ.-->

Orthography
For a long time, Pite Sámi was one of the four Sámi languages without an official written language. A working orthography was developed in 2008–2011 by the Sámi Association of Arjeplog; this version was described by Joshua Wilbur and implemented in the dictionary Pitesamisk ordbok samt stavningsregler, published in 2016. On August 20, 2019, an official orthography was approved for the language. The orthography closely resembles the orthography of neighbouring Lule Sámi.

Digraphs

Lexicographic sources
A number of (re)sources exist with extensive collections of Pite Sámi lexical items, including grammatical and (morpho)phonological information to various extents. These include:
 Ignácz Halász published a collection of Pite Sámi lexical items in 1896 with Hungarian and German translations in the book Pite lappmarki szótár és nyelvtan. Pite Sámi words are written in using a UPA-type standard. 
 Eliel Lagercrantz published a two-volume collection of Sámi lexical items in 1939 titled Lappischer Wortschatz with German translations. Many of the entries include Pite Sámi forms, which are marked with the abbreviation Arj (for Arjeplog, as Pite Sámi is often referred to as "Arjeplog Sámi" as well). Pite Sámi words are written in using a UPA-type standard. 
Just Knud Qvigstad created a wordlist of Pite Sámi words in his Lappisk ordliste : Arjeplog-dialekt (Beiarn–Saltdal–Rana). This handwritten manuscript is from around 1928 and can be found on the Norwegian National Library website
 Israel Ruong's collection of handwritten note cards and other materials with Pite Sámi lexical items is archived at the Swedish Institute for Language and Folklore in Uppsala.
 Although not intended primarily as a lexicographic collection, Israel Ruong's 1943 dissertation Lappische Verbalableitung dargestellt auf Grundlage des Pitelappischen is in fact a rich source of derived verbs. These are presented in a somewhat simplified UPA-type transcription with explanations and translations in German.
 Arjeplogs sameförening (the Arjeplog Sámi association) carried out a project called Insamling av pitesamiska ord (Collection of Pite Sámi words) between 2008 and 2012, written in a preliminary version of the current standard orthography. This wordlist includes translations into Swedish and Norwegian.
 A Pite Sámi dictionary and set of orthographic rules was published in 2016 as Pitesamisk ordbok samst stavningsregler in the book series Samica. This collection is based on the wordlist created by Arjeplogs sameförening (cf. previous item), but with significant editing and additions covering grammatical and phonological information by the editor (J. Wilbur). It includes translations into Swedish and English, and uses a preliminary version of the current standard orthography. A website with these orthographic rules can be found at Pitesamiska stavningsregler.
 A searchable lexical database is accessible online at Bidumsáme Báhkogirrje. It is maintained by linguist J. Wilbur (in collaboration with O. Utne and P. Steggo), and is regularly being updated, corrected and edited, especially checking for consistency and adherence to the standard orthography; missing lexemes are also added on a regular basis.
 A searchable lexical database including automatically generated inflectional paradigms for a large subset of the lexical items in the Bidumsáme Báhkogirrje (cf. previous item) can be found in the Nähttadigibáhko, hosted by Giellatekno at the University of Tromsø, with collaborative development of the language technology tools for Pite Sámi by J. Wilbur. This uses the standard orthography.
 A mobile phone app called BidumBágo (for Android systems) is under development by Olve Utne at the Norwegian Institute of Local History and National Library of Norway (in collaboration with P. Steggo and J. Wilbur). It currently has more than 6300 entries, including references to older sources, many place names, and translations into Norwegian, Swedish, German and English. This uses the standard orthography and can be downloaded from the Facebook group BidumBágo.

Grammar

Cases
Pite Sámi has nine cases:

Nominative
Genitive
Accusative
Inessive
Illative
Elative
Comitative
Essive
Abessive

Verbs

Person
Pite Sámi verbs conjugate for three grammatical persons:

first person
second person
third person

Mood
Pite Sámi has five grammatical moods:

indicative
imperative
conditional
potential
optative

Grammatical number
Pite Sámi verbs conjugate for three grammatical numbers:

singular
dual
plural

Tense
Pite Sámi verbs conjugate for two simple tenses:

past
non-past

and two compound tenses:

Present perfect
Pluperfect

Negative verb
Pite Sámi, like Finnish, the other Sámi languages and Estonian, has a negative verb. In Pite Sámi, the negative verb conjugates according to mood (indicative, imperative and optative), person (1st, 2nd and 3rd) and number (singular, dual and plural). This differs from some of the other Sámi languages, e.g. from Northern Sámi, which do not conjugate according to tense and other Sámi languages, that do not use the optative.

For non-past indicative versions that have more than one form, the second one is from the dialect spoken around Björkfjället and the third is from the Svaipa dialect. The plurality in the other forms is due to parallel forms that are not bound by dialect.

Notes

References
 
 
 
 
 Pite Saami Documentation Project. www2.hu-berlin.de/psdp. 2009.05.03.
 
 
 
 
 Wilbur, Joshua (2016). "Stavningsregler" In: Pitesamisk ordbok samt stavningsregler (=Samica 2), ed. by Joshua Wilbur. Freiburg: Albert-Ludwigs-Universität Freiburg. pages 123-197

External links

 

 

 
Endangered languages of Europe
Endangered Uralic languages
Languages of Norway
Languages of Sweden
Sámi in Norway
Sámi in Sweden
Western Sámi languages